Gábor Darvas (until 1952 Gábor Steinberger; 18 January 1911 – 18 February 1985) was a Hungarian composer and musicologist. He was one of the first Hungarian composers to work in the field of electronic music. As a musicologist, his interest was primarily in music of the 15th and 16th centuries.

Biography 
He was born at Szatmárnémeti (Austria-Hungary) in 1911. His family moved to Budapest in 1918, where he finished his high school studies.

He studied piano from the age of nine, from 1926 until 1932 he attended the Academy of Music in Budapest as an instrumentalists and later studied composition under Zoltán Kodály. In 1939 he left the country. During the World War II, he lived in Chile, working as a conductor and a musicologist. He was a direct assistant of Erich Kleiber, In 1948 he returned to Hungary, where he has continued his composer activity in 1951, commencing  an active career as a composer, writing film scores as well as pieces using tape. He was musical expert of  various cultural institutions  until 1972. In addition to  composing, he explored, orchestrated, published values of European music history, and wrote several musicological books.

He died in 1985 in Budapest.

Compositions 
 Improvisations symphoniques (1963) for piano and orchestra
 Sectio aurea (1964) for orchestra
 Medália (Medal) on a poem by Attila József (1965) for soprano, keyboard instruments, percussion and loudspeaker
 Rotation for 5 (1967) for vibraphone, marimba, guitarre, cimbalom and piano
 A torony (The tower) (1967) for voices and instruments
 Magánzárka (Solitary confinement) (1970) for percussion and tape
 Preludium (Prelude)(1970) for tape
 Passiózene (Passion music) (1974–78) for voices and tape
 Bánat (Grief) on a poem by Gábor Karinthy (1978) for baritone, orchestra and tape
 Reminiszcenciák (Reminiscences) (1979) for tape
 Poèmes électroniques (1982–83) for tape
 Fantázia (Phantasy) (1983) for piano and chamber ensemble
 Etudes symphoniques (1984) for orchestra

Recording 
 1982 Gábor Darvas : Prelude - Medal - Solitary Confinement - Grief - Reminiscences – Hungaroton Classics SLPX 12365

Books 
 A szimfonikus zenekar (Zeneműkiadó Vállalat Budapest, 1958)
 A zenekari muzsika műhelytitkai (Zeneműkiadó Vállalat Budapest, 1960)
 Évezredek hangszerei (Zeneműkiadó Vállalat Budapest, 1961)
 Zenei ABC (Zeneműkiadó Vállalat Budapest, 1963)
 Bevezető a zene világába (1-5) (Zeneműkiadó Budapest, 1965)
 A zene anatómiája (Zeneműkiadó Budapest, 1974, 1975, 1985)
 Zenei minilexikon (Zeneműkiadó Budapest, 1974)
 A totem-zenétől a hegedűversenyig (Zeneműkiadó Budapest, 1977)
 Zenei zseblexikon (Zeneműkiadó Budapest, 1978, 1982, 1987)
 Zene Bachtól napjainkig (Zeneműkiadó Budapest, 1981)

Awards 
 Erkel Prize in 1955

External links
 Gábor Darvas website – list of works and more
 Article by Péter Várnai - Tempo, 1969

1911 births
1985 deaths
People from Satu Mare
20th-century classical composers
Franz Liszt Academy of Music alumni
Hungarian classical composers
Hungarian male classical composers
Hungarian classical musicians
Hungarian musicologists
20th-century musicologists
20th-century Hungarian male musicians